The fort of Rosemont is a fortification located in the French city of Besançon (Franche-Comté). Built on the summit of the hill of Rosemont during the Franco-Prussian War, for support the fort of Planoise and the fort of Chaudanne, It composed of two buildings (one small fort and one magazine) which had six rooms. But no battles took place in the city, since Rosemont was dismantled just before World War I. It has been vandalised in the recent history, but recently the two buildings were restored and yet visitors are still prohibited. Rosemont is the smallest fort in the city after the lunettes of Trois-Châtels and Tousey. 

Buildings and structures in Besançon
Rosemont
Ruins in Bourgogne-Franche-Comté